Lycodichthys antarcticus is a species of fish of the family Zoarcidae. It occurs in the Southern Ocean. It grows to  total length.

References

External links

 Lycodichthys antarcticus at Encyclopedia of Life
 Lycodichthys antarcticus at Discover Life

Lycodinae
Fish of the Southern Ocean
Fish described in 1911